Alfred Carl Frank Neeson (born 15 June 1914, date of death unknown) was an Australian rules footballer who played for the Fitzroy Football Club and Hawthorn Football Club in the Victorian Football League (VFL).

Career
Neeson was originally from Frankston, but played in Sydney with St George then Goulburn in the Canberra league, before joining Fitzroy. He made seven appearances for Fitzroy, over the 1935 and 1936 seasons, followed by three years with Hawthorn, for which he played 34 games.

In 1939, while in Western Australia playing for East Perth, Neeson was sentenced to four-months imprisonment for stealing a motor car.

He also played for the Mines Rovers in the Goldfields Football League and was the competition's best and fairest winner in 1947.

Notes

External links 
		

1914 births
Year of death missing
Fitzroy Football Club players
Hawthorn Football Club players
Australian rules footballers from Victoria (Australia)
Australian male criminals
Frankston Bombers players
St George AFC players
East Perth Football Club players
Mines Rovers Football Club players